The mule deer (Odocoileus hemionus) is a deer indigenous to western North America; it is named for its ears, which are large like those of the mule. Two subspecies of mule deer are grouped into the black-tailed deer.

Unlike the related white-tailed deer (Odocoileus virginianus), which is found throughout most of North America east of the Rocky Mountains and in the valleys of the Rocky Mountains from Idaho and Wyoming northward, mule deer are only found on the western Great Plains, in the Rocky Mountains, in the southwest United States, and on the west coast of North America. Mule deer have also been introduced to Argentina and Kauai, Hawaii.

Taxonomy
Mule deer can be divided into two main groups: the mule deer (sensu stricto) and the black-tailed deer. The first group includes all subspecies, except O. h. columbianus and O. h. sitkensis, which are in the black-tailed deer group. The two main groups have been treated as separate species, but they hybridize, and virtually all recent authorities treat the mule deer and black-tailed deer as conspecific. Mule deer apparently evolved from the black-tailed deer. Despite this, the mtDNA of the white-tailed deer and mule deer is similar, but differs from that of the black-tailed deer. This may be the result of introgression, although hybrids between the mule deer and white-tailed deer are rare in the wild (apparently more common locally in West Texas), and the hybrid survival rate is low even in captivity. Many claims of observations of wild hybrids are not legitimate, as identification based on external features is complicated.

Subspecies
Some authorities have recognized O. h. crooki as a senior synonym of O. h. eremicus, but the type specimen of the former is a hybrid between the mule deer and white-tailed deer, so the name O. h. crooki is invalid. Additionally, the validity of O. h. inyoensis has been questioned, and the two insular O. h. cerrosensis and O. h. sheldoni may be synonyms of O. h. eremicus or O. h. peninsulae.

The 10 valid subspecies, based on the third edition of Mammal Species of the World, are:

 Mule deer (sensu stricto) group:
O. h. californicus – California mule deer
O. h. cerrosensis – Cedros/Cerros Island mule deer; named after Cedros Island, the only place the subspecies is found
O. h. eremicus – desert/burro mule deer; found in the Lower Colorado River Valley, northwestern Mexico, southeastern California, and Arizona
O. h. fuliginatus – southern mule deer; found in southernmost California and Baja California
O. h. hemionus – Rocky Mountain mule deer; found in western and central North America
O. h. inyoensis – Inyo mule deer; named after Inyo County, California and found in the Sierra Nevada mountain range in California
O. h. peninsulae – peninsular mule deer; found in Baja California Sur
O. h. sheldoni – Tiburon Island mule deer; found on Tiburón Island
 Black-tailed deer group:
O. h. columbianus – Columbian black-tailed deer; found in the Pacific Northwest and Northern California regions
O. h. sitkensis – Sitka deer; named after Sitka, Alaska and found in the coastal area and islands off western British Columbia

Description

The most noticeable differences between white-tailed and mule deer are ear size, tail color, and antler configuration. In many cases, body size is also a key difference. The mule deer's tail is black-tipped, whereas the white-tailed deer's is not. Mule deer antlers are bifurcated; they "fork" as they grow, rather than branching from a single main beam, as is the case with white-tails.

Each spring, a buck's antlers start to regrow almost immediately after the old antlers are shed. Shedding typically takes place in mid-February, with variations occurring by locale.

Although capable of running, mule deer are often seen stotting (also called pronking), with all four feet coming down together.

Of this, the tail may comprise .

Unlike the white-tailed, the mule deer does not generally show marked size variation across its range, although environmental conditions can cause considerable weight fluctuations in any given population. An exception to this is the Sitka deer subspecies (O. h. sitkensis).

Seasonal behaviors
In addition to movements related to available shelter and food, the breeding cycle is important in understanding deer behavior. The "rut" or mating season usually begins in the fall as does go into estrus for a period of a few days and males become more aggressive, competing for mates. Does may mate with more than one buck and go back into estrus within a month if they did not become pregnant. The gestation period is about 190–200 days, with fawns born in the spring. The survival rate of the fawns during labor is about 50%. Fawns stay with their mothers during the summer and are weaned in the fall after about 60–75 days. Mule deer females usually give birth to two fawns, although if it is their first time having a fawn, they often have just one.

A buck's antlers fall off during the winter, then grow again in preparation for the next season's rut. The annual cycle of antler growth is regulated by changes in the length of the day.

The size of mule deer groups follows a marked seasonal pattern. Groups are smallest during fawning season (June and July in Saskatchewan and Alberta) and largest in early gestation (winter; February and March in Saskatchewan and Alberta).

Besides humans, the three leading predators of mule deer are coyotes, wolves, and cougars. Bobcats, Canada lynx, wolverines, American black bears, and grizzly bears may prey upon adult deer, but most often only attack fawns or infirm specimens, or eat a deer after it has died naturally. Bears and smaller-sized carnivores are typically opportunistic feeders, and pose little threat to a strong, healthy mule deer.

Diet and foraging behaviors
In 99 studies of mule deer diets, some 788 species of plants were eaten by mule deer, and their diets vary greatly depending on the season, geographic region, year, and elevation. The studies gave these data for Rocky Mountain mule deer diets:

The diets of mule deer are very similar to those of white-tailed deer in areas where they coexist. Mule deer are intermediate feeders rather than pure browsers or grazers; they predominantly browse, but also eat forb vegetation, small amounts of grass, and where available, tree or shrub fruits such as beans, pods, nuts (including acorns), and berries.

Mule deer readily adapt to agricultural products and landscape plantings. In the Sierra Nevada range, mule deer depend on the lichen Bryoria fremontii as a winter food source.

The most common plant species consumed by mule deer are:

 Among trees and shrubs: Artemisia tridentata (big sagebrush), Cercocarpus ledifolius (curlleaf mountain mahogany), Cercocarpus montanus (true mountain mahogany), Cowania mexicana (Mexican cliffrose), Populus tremuloides (quaking aspen), Purshia tridentata (antelope bitterbrush), Quercus gambelii (Gambel oak), and Rhus trilobata (skunkbush sumac). 
 Among forbs: Achillea millefolium (western yarrow), Antennaria (pussytoes) species, Artemisia frigida (fringed sagebrush), Artemisia ludoviciana (Louisiana sagewort), Aster species, Astragalus (milkvetch) species, Balsamorhiza sagittata (arrowleaf balsamroot), Cirsium (thistle) species, Erigeron (fleabane) species, Geranium species, Lactuca serriola (prickly lettuce), Lupinus (lupine) species, alfalfa, Penstemon species, Phlox species, Polygonum (knotweed/smartweed) species, Potentilla (cinquefoil) species, Taraxacum officinale (dandelion), Tragopogon dubius (western salsify), clover, and Vicia americana (American vetch).
 Among grasses and grasslike species: Agropyron, Elymus (wheatgrasses), Elytrigia, Pascopyrum species (wheatgrasses), Pseudoroegneria spicatum (bluebunch wheatgrass), Bromus tectorum (cheatgrass), Carex (sedge) species, Festuca idahoensis (Idaho fescue), Poa fendleriana (muttongrass), Poa pratensis (Kentucky bluegrass), and other Poa (bluegrass) species.

Mule deer have also been known to eat ricegrass, gramagrass, and needlegrass, as well as bearberry, bitter cherry, black oak, California buckeye, ceanothus, cedar, cliffrose, cottonwood, creek dogwood, creeping barberry, dogwood, Douglas fir, elderberry, Fendlera species, goldeneye, holly-leaf buckthorn, jack pine, knotweed, Kohleria species, manzanita, mesquite, pine, rabbitbrush, ragweed, redberry, scrub oak, serviceberry (including Pacific serviceberry), Sierra juniper, silktassel, snowberry, stonecrop, sunflower, tesota, thimbleberry, turbinella oak, velvet elder, western chokecherry, wild cherry, and wild oats. Where available, mule deer also eat a variety of wild mushrooms, which are most abundant in late summer and fall in the southern Rocky Mountains; mushrooms provide moisture, protein, phosphorus, and potassium.

Humans sometimes engage in supplemental feeding efforts in severe winters in an attempt to avoid mule deer starvation. Wildlife agencies discourage such efforts, which cause harm to mule deer populations by spreading disease (such as tuberculosis and chronic wasting disease) when deer congregate for feed, disrupting migratory patterns, causing overpopulation of local mule deer populations, and cause habitat destruction overbrowsing of shrubs and forbs. Supplemental feeding efforts might be appropriate when carefully conducted under limited circumstances, but to be successful, the feeding must begin early in the severe winter (before poor range conditions and severe weather cause malnourishment or starvation) and must be continued until range conditions can support the herd.

Mule deer are variably gregarious, with a large proportion of solitary individuals (35 to 64%) and small groups (groups with ≤5 deer, 50 to 78%). Reported mean group size measurements are three to five and typical group size (i.e. crowding) is about seven.

Nutrition
Mule deer are ruminants, meaning they employ a nutrient acquisition strategy of fermenting plant material before digesting it. Deer consuming high-fiber, low-starch diets require less food than those consuming high-starch, low-fiber diets. Rumination time also increases when deer consume high-fiber, low-starch diets, which allows for increased nutrient acquisition due to greater length of fermentation. Because some of the subspecies of mule deer are migratory, they encounter variable habitats and forage quality throughout the year. Forages consumed in the summer are higher in digestible components (i.e. proteins, starches, sugars, and hemicellulose) than those consumed in the winter. The average gross energy content of the consumed forage material is 4.5kcal/g.

Due to fluctuations in forage quality and availability, mule deer fat storage varies throughout the year, with the most fat stored in October, which is depleted throughout the winter to the lowest levels of fat storage in March. Changes in hormone levels are indications of physiological adjustments to the changes in the habitat. Total body fat is a measure of the individual's energy reserves, while thyroid hormone concentrations are a metric to determine the deer's ability to use the fat reserves. Triiodothyronine (T3) hormone is directly involved with basal metabolic rate and thermoregulation.

Migration
Mule deer migrate from low elevation winter ranges to high elevations summer ranges. Although not all individuals in populations migrate, some will travel long distances between summer and winter ranges. Researchers discovered the longest mule deer migration in Wyoming spanning 150 miles from winter to summer range Multiple US states track mule deer migrations.

Mule deer migrate in fall to avoid harsh winter conditions like deep snow that covers up food resources, and in spring follow the emergence of new growth northwards. There is evidence to suggest that mule deer migrate based on cognitive memory, meaning they use the same path year after year even if the availability of resources has changed. This contradicts the idea that animals will go to the areas with the best available resources, which makes migratory paths crucial for survival.

Risks 
There are many risks that mule deer face during migration including climate change and human disturbance. Climate change impacts on seasonal growth patterns constitute a risk for migrating mule deer by invalidating historic or learned migration paths.

Human activities such as natural resource extraction, highways, fencing, and urban development all have an impact on mule deer populations and migrations through habitat degradation and fragmentation. Natural gas extraction has been found to have varying negative effects on mule deer behavior and can even cause them to avoid areas they use to migrate. Highways not only cause injury and death to mule deer, but they can also serve as a barrier to migration. As traffic volumes increase, the more mule deer tend to avoid those areas and abandon their typical migration routes. It has also been found that fencing can alter deer behavior, acting as a barrier, and potentially changing mule deer migration patterns. In addition, urban development has replaced mule deer habitat with subdivisions, and human activity has increased. As a result of this, researchers have seen a decline in mule deer populations. This is especially prominent in Colorado where the population has grown by over 2.2 million since 1980.

Management

Protecting migration corridors 
Protecting migrations corridors is essential to maintain healthy mule deer populations. One thing everyone can do is help slow the increase in climate change by using greener energy sources and reducing the amount of waste in our households. In addition, managers and researchers can assess the risks listed above and take the proper steps to mitigate any adverse impacts those risk have on mule deer populations. Not only will populations benefit from these efforts but so will many other wildlife species.

Highways 
One way to help protect deer from getting hit on roadways is to install high fence wildlife fencing with escape routes. This helps keep deer off the road, preventing vehicle collisions and allowing animals that are trapped between the road and the fence a way to escape to safety. However, to maintain migration routes that cross busy highways, managers have also implemented natural, vegetated, overpasses and underpasses to allow animals, like mule deer, to migrate and move safely across highways.

Natural resource extraction 
Approaches to mitigating the impact of drilling and mining operations include regulating the time of year when active drilling and heavy traffic to sites are taking place, and using well-informed planning to protect critical deer habitat and using barriers to mitigate the activity, noise, light at the extraction sites.

Urban development 
The increase in urbanization has impacted mule deer migrations and there is evidence to show it also disrupts gene flow among mule deer populations. One clear option is to not build houses in critical mule deer habitat; however, build near mule deer habitat has resulted in some deer becoming accustom to humans and the resources, such as food and water. Rather than migrate through urban areas some deer tend to stay close to those urban developments, potentially for resources and to avoid the obstacles in urban areas. Suggested measures by property owners to protect mule deer genetic diversity and migration paths include planting deer-resistant plants, placing scare devices such as noise-makers, and desisting from feeding deer.

Disease
Wildlife officials in Utah announced that a November–December 2021 field study had detected the first case of SARS-CoV-2 in mule deer. Several deer possessed apparent SARS-CoV-2 antibodies, however a female deer in Morgan County had an active Delta variant infection. White-tailed deer, which are able to hybridize with mule deer and which have shown high rates of SARS-CoV-2 infection, have migrated into Morgan County and other traditional mule deer habitats since at least the early 2000s.

References

Further reading

External links

 Mule Deer Odocoileus hemionus (Rafinesque 1817) at the Encyclopedia of Life

Odocoileus
Mammals of North America
mule deer
Articles containing video clips
Taxa named by Constantine Samuel Rafinesque